Gabriel Luukkonen (22 January 1880, Juva – 11 October 1943) was a Finnish politician. He was a Member of the Parliament of Finland from 1919 to 1922, representing the Social Democratic Party of Finland (SDP).

References

1880 births
1943 deaths
People from Juva
People from Mikkeli Province (Grand Duchy of Finland)
Social Democratic Party of Finland politicians
Members of the Parliament of Finland (1919–22)